On September 20, 2018, four people were shot and killed outside a Rite Aid distribution center in Aberdeen, Maryland, United States. This was the second mass shooting in Maryland in 2018, following the Capital Gazette shooting.

Incident 
The suspect had entered the facility to report to work as usual, before opening fire on victims inside and outside of the facility. The Harford County sheriff stated that calls of "shots fired" came from the Rite Aid distribution center at approximately 9:06 am. EDT. Deputies responded at 9:09 am. Officers reportedly never discharged their weapons while responding to the scene. Agents from the Baltimore offices of the Bureau of Alcohol, Tobacco, Firearms and Explosives (ATF) and the FBI responded to the scene.

Victims 
Preliminary reports suggest that at least three people were killed in the attack, although the Harford County Sheriff declined to give a precise number of wounded and deceased victims during the press conference. Two victims died at the scene and a two in the hospital. It was later reported that the suspect died at the hospital due to a self-inflicted gunshot wound to her head.

Victims were transported to Johns Hopkins Bayview Hospital in Baltimore and Christiana Hospital in Delaware. Johns Hopkins Bayview Medical Center Trauma Director released a statement that the hospital received four victims with gunshot wounds, and by 2:30 pm. ET, two patients were stable and two were seriously injured.

Perpetrator 
The shooter was admitted to the hospital, and officials did not immediately identify the suspect. It was confirmed that per initial sweeps of the site the suspect was armed with a single 9mm Glock 17 handgun. Later, the Harford County Sheriff's Office revealed the identity of the shooter as being Snochia Moseley, 26, an African American woman of Baltimore County who was a temporary worker at the facility. Moseley shot herself in the head and later died of her wounds at the hospital. The Washington Post reported that Moseley "had been beset for years by mental illness as well as emotional turmoil related to her struggle with sexual identity, according to authorities and a close friend."

Response 
After the shooting, a reunification center was set up at a fire department in Havre de Grace.

Maryland Governor Larry Hogan used Twitter to express his condolences and thoughts on the situation and tweeted "We are closely monitoring the horrific shooting in Aberdeen. Our prayers are with all those impacted, including our first responders."

Rite Aid released a statement emphasizing their continuation to work closely with authorities as the investigation continued, and stating that the company would provide grief counselors as long as needed. The company also offered their thoughts and prayers to all those involved in the situation.

See also 
 2018 Cincinnati shooting

References 

2018 in Maryland
2018 mass shootings in the United States
2018 murders in the United States
Aberdeen, Maryland
Attacks in the United States in 2018
Deaths by firearm in Maryland
Mass shootings in Maryland
Mass shootings in the United States
September 2018 crimes in the United States
September 2018 events in the United States
Workplace violence in the United States
Workplace shootings in the United States
2018 active shooter incidents in the United States